Sanjida Islam (born 1 April 1996) is a Bangladeshi cricketer who plays for the Bangladesh women's national cricket team. She is a right-handed batter. Sanjida was born in Rangpur, Bangladesh.

Personal life
On 21 October 2020, she married Bangladeshi first class cricketer Mim Mosaddeak.

Career

Sanjida made her T20I career against Ireland women's cricket team on August 28, 2012. In June 2018, she was part of Bangladesh's squad that won their first ever Women's Asia Cup title, winning the 2018 Women's Twenty20 Asia Cup tournament. Later the same month, she was named in Bangladesh's squad for the 2018 ICC Women's World Twenty20 Qualifier tournament.

In October 2018, she was named in Bangladesh's squad for the 2018 ICC Women's World Twenty20 tournament in the West Indies. In August 2019, she was named in Bangladesh's squad for the 2019 ICC Women's World Twenty20 Qualifier tournament in Scotland. She was the leading run-scorer for Bangladesh in the tournament, with 156 runs in five matches. In November 2019, she was named in Bangladesh's squad for the cricket tournament at the 2019 South Asian Games. The Bangladesh team beat Sri Lanka by two runs in the final to win the gold medal. In January 2020, she was named in Bangladesh's squad for the 2020 ICC Women's T20 World Cup in Australia.

References

External links
 
 

1996 births
Living people
People from Rangpur District
21st-century Bangladeshi cricketers
Bangladeshi women cricketers
Bangladesh women Twenty20 International cricketers
Bangladesh women One Day International cricketers
Asian Games medalists in cricket
Cricketers at the 2014 Asian Games
Asian Games silver medalists for Bangladesh
Medalists at the 2014 Asian Games
South Asian Games gold medalists for Bangladesh
South Asian Games medalists in cricket
Chittagong Division women cricketers
Dhaka Division women cricketers
Rangpur Division women cricketers
Eastern Zone women cricketers